Enyalioides sophiarothschildae, or the Rothschild's woodlizard, is a species of lizards in the family Hoplocercidae. It is endemic to the Amazonian slopes of the Cordillera Central in northeastern Peru. It differs from its congeneric species by possessing homogeneous (size) caudal scales on each caudal segment, a white gular region that has a black patch as well as turquoise scales in males, and immaculate white labials and chin.

References

Enyalioides
Lizards of South America
Reptiles of Peru
Endemic fauna of Peru
Reptiles described in 2015
Taxa named by Omar Torres-Carvajal
Taxa named by Pablo J. Venegas
Taxa named by Kevin de Queiroz